Heu Heu, or the Monster is a novel by H. Rider Haggard. Allan Quatermain tells the story of a monster in Rhodesia.

The novel features a legend about a giant gorilla monster, to which young women are sacrificed. Some writers have suggested Heu-Heu may have influenced the script of the movie King Kong (by Merian C. Cooper and Edgar Wallace), which has a similar plotline.

Plot 
Allan and his sidekick, the faithful and always amusing Hottentot Hans go on a mission for the Zulu wizard Zikali (himself featured in many of the previous Quatermain books) and endeavor to bring back some leaves from the rare Tree of Illusions. They also attempt to delve into the mystery of Heu-Heu, a monstrous, 12-foot-tall, clawed and red-bearded semi-gorilla god who may or may not exist. As is usual in Haggard's novels, Heu-Heu starts off with an action set piece, a storm in which the heroes are forced to seek shelter in a Bushmen's cave, and from there moves swiftly and excitingly.

Reception
E. F. Bleiler's review of Heu-Heu states "while the lost-race aspects of the Walloo are somewhat stale, the descriptions of Black native life are, as always, fascinating"

References

External links
Complete book at Project Gutenberg

Novels by H. Rider Haggard
1924 British novels
1924 fantasy novels
Novels set in Rhodesia
Fiction set in 1871